Blake Wise is an American country music singer from Nebo, North Carolina. He is signed to the independent Broken Bow Records, for which he has released three singles: "Cornfields," "I've Got This Feeling" and "Can't Live Without."

Biography
Wise learned to play guitar at age four and began touring with his father at age thirteen. Two years later, a record label manager encouraged Wise to move to Nashville, Tennessee once Wise had turned eighteen.

Wise signed to Equity Music Group in 2008 at age nineteen. The label closed soon afterward, and he signed to Broken Bow Records in September 2009. Broken Bow released his single "Cornfields" in mid-2010, followed by "I've Got This Feeling" later in the year. This song debuted at number 59 on the Billboard Hot Country Songs chart dated for the week ending December 11, 2010. A third single, "Can't Live Without," was released in September 2011.

Discography

Singles

Music videos

References

External links
Official website

1989 births
American country singer-songwriters
American male singer-songwriters
BBR Music Group artists
Equity Music Group artists
Living people
Singer-songwriters from North Carolina
People from McDowell County, North Carolina
21st-century American singers
Country musicians from North Carolina
21st-century American male singers